The year 1999 was the 218th year of the Rattanakosin Kingdom of Thailand. It was the 54th year in the reign of King Bhumibol Adulyadej (Rama IX), and is reckoned as year 2542 in the Buddhist Era.

Incumbents
 King: Bhumibol Adulyadej
 Crown Prince: Vajiralongkorn
 Prime Minister: Chuan Leekpai
 Supreme Patriarch: Nyanasamvara Suvaddhana

Events

Births

Deaths

References

 
Years of the 20th century in Thailand
Thailand
Thailand
1990s in Thailand